Villa Juana is a sector or neighborhood in the city of Santo Domingo in the Distrito Nacional of the [[Dominican Republic].

References

Sources 
Distrito Nacional sectors

Populated places in Santo Domingo